Blockhead(s) may refer to:

Films
 The Blockhead, a 1921 German silent film
 Block-Heads, a 1938 film starring Laurel and Hardy
 Blockhead (film), a 1966 Italian film

Music 
 Blockhead (music producer) (born 1976), American hip-hop producer
 Blockheads (French band), a French grindcore band
 The Blockheads, a UK rock band
 "Blockheads", a song by Ian Dury from New Boots and Panties!!
 "Blockhead", a song by Devo from Duty Now for the Future

Other uses
 African blockhead cichlid or Lionhead cichlid, a fish
 Blockhead!, a block stacking game
 Blockheads (Gumby), a pair of fictional characters from the TV series Gumby
 Blockhead (thought experiment), also known as Blockhead argument
 "Blockheads" (Arrested Development), an episode of Arrested Development
 The Blockheads (video game), a handheld device game released in 2013
 Human Blockhead, a circus sideshow performer
 The name used for a character in the game Blockland
 Another name for the Harley-Davidson Evolution engine

See also
 "Blockhead Hans", a fairy tale
 Peanuts, a comic strip by Charles M. Schulz that commonly uses the term "Blockhead" by the characters
 Thickhead (disambiguation)